VoNR or 'Voice over New Radio' (also referred to as Voice over 5G or Vo5G) is a 5G high-speed wireless communication standard for mobile phones and data terminals, including Internet of things (IoT) devices and wearables. VoNR fully utilizes the 5G Standalone (SA) core and can have better voice quality than its predecessor Voice over Long Term Evolution (VoLTE). Call setup time is faster than VoLTE due to the inherent lower latency of 5G NR. 5G VoNR removes the LTE anchor allowing the voice call to stay on a 5G network.

VoNR calls are usually charged at the same rate as other calls.

To be able to make a VoNR call, the device, its firmware, and the mobile telephone provider must all support the service in the area, and be able to work together.

See also 
 Voice over LTE
 Video over NR (ViNR)
 IMT-2020 – the International Telecommunication Union standards
 List of 5G NR networks

References 
 What is 5G VoNR?
 Standalone 5G vs. Non-Standalone 5G
 5G | ShareTechnote

5G (telecommunication)
Mobile technology
Telecommunications-related introductions in 2021
Voice over IP